The Crotale (English: "Rattlesnake") is a French, all-weather, short-range surface-to-air missile system developed to intercept airborne ranged weapons and aircraft, from cruise or anti-ship missiles to helicopters, UAVs or low-flying high-performance fighter aircraft. It was developed by Thomson CSF Matra (now Thales Group) and consists of a mobile land-based variant as well as various naval ones.

Development 
Originally the Crotale R440 system was developed by Rockwell International and Thomson-Houston (and Mistral) in France for South Africa, where it was named Cactus. However, the achievements of the system impressed the French Armed Forces, who purchased the system both for the air force and for the navy.

The firing system includes the main sensors of the ship, the firing system of the turret, and a central coordination system. The turret holds eight missiles ready for launch in watertight containers. The magazine behind the turret holds 18 missiles.

The French army first utilised a 4x4 wheeled vehicle, armed with four launchers. In order to ensure higher mobility, it was decided to mount the system on the chassis of the French AMX-30 main battle tank. At the same time, the number of launchers was increased to six. In Finnish Army service, the Crotale NG system has been mounted on Sisu Pasi vehicles. Here the number of launchers is eight.

The Crotale system has also been installed on various military ships. For instance, the French Navy s have a Crotale 8-tubed launcher near the helicopter flight deck.

The Automatic command to line-of-sight guidance system uses both Radar and IRST to locate a target and to track it and the missile.

Crotale NG 
A modernized version, the Crotale NG (New Generation), entered production in 1990. This version used the new VT-1 missile with Mach 3.5 speed, load factor to 35G, 11 km range, 13 kg warhead (8 m kill-zone) and 6,000 m ceiling.  The system includes a S-band Pulse Doppler radar (20 km), Ku-band TWT tracking radar (30 km), Thermal camera (19 km), Daylight CCD camera (15 km), and an IR localiser. An early '90s proposal to fit the system (in its eight-round form) to a Leclerc tank chassis in order to provide a battlefield air defence vehicle for protecting armored formations on the move was not realised due to post-Cold War cutbacks.

K-SAM Pegasus 
In 1999, the Republic of Korea Armed Forces awarded a contract to Samsung Thales to jointly develop a South Korean-augmented Crotale NG system for the K-SAM Pegasus short-range air defense system. A new sensor system was jointly developed by Samsung and Thales to meet the required operational capability of the upcoming K-SAM Pegasus, as well as a new indigenous missile by LIG Nex1. The electronics and radars were developed by Samsung Electronics. Doosan DST integrated this modified Crotale NG system with a K200 vehicle. 48 units were initially produced for a price-tag of 330 million Euros. A second batch of 66 units was ordered in 2003, valued at 470 million Euros.

Multi-Shield 100 
Thales revealed an updated Crotale NG system with Shikra radar at the Paris Air Show in 2007. The system combines Crotale Mk3 VT-1 missile and Shikra  multi-beam search radar, with 150 km (detection range). Thales has demonstrated that the system's VT-1 missile has extended range to 15 km.

Technology 
The Crotale missile system consists of two components; a vehicle for transport, equipped with 2-8 launchers; a tracking radar located between the launchers. A second vehicle carries the surveillance radar. The radar surveillance vehicle can be connected to several launcher vehicles, in order to achieve an effective air-defence system. The Crotale NG has incorporated both the launcher and the surveillance radar in one vehicle.

The missile is propelled by a solid-propellant rocket motor and can accelerate to a maximum speed of Mach 2.3 in two seconds. The missile is sent guidance commands by the base unit directing keeping it on the line of sight until its infrared proximity fuze senses that it is near its target and explodes.

The surveillance radar and fire direction radar have a range of 20 km and the TV link works up to 15 km. The TV guidance system uses both regular and infrared cameras. The system can follow 8 targets simultaneously, and the guidance radar can follow both hovering helicopters as well as fighters exceeding Mach 2. The Crotale can also use surveillance data from other systems, data from optical surveillance and from the general aerial picture from the national air defence communications system.

Variants 

R440 Crotale  The original Crotale SAM system, with both land and sea (Sea Crotale) systems.  Over 330 systems and several thousand missiles were produced and exported to more than 15 countries.
R460 SICA (Shahine) Thomson-CSF (now Thales) developed a specific version of the Crotale known as "Shahine" for Saudi Arabia. The system became operational in 1980. The main visible differences are mainly the carrier (an AMX 30 armoured carrier instead of the non-protected classic carrier), and that it carries a six-missile firing unit (instead of four). The purpose of the changes was to allow the Shahine firing and acquisition units to follow and protect the armoured units of the Saudi Armed Forces on the battlefield. The Shahine units were among the first vehicles to liberate Kuwait City in February 1991 – a picture taken of the scene was widely publicised by Newsweek magazine.
Liberty Forward Area Air Defense System  Developed in conjunction with LTV for the US Army's Line of Sight-Forward Heavy competition, the Liberty air defense system consisted of either 6 R460 SICA or 6 VT-1 missiles mounted on an M1A1 Abrams chassis along with a pair of 25mm cannons
Crotale NG (VT-1)
An updated version, New Generation. Finland was the first operator of the system. The cost of the system is roughly 8 million euros (excluding the vehicle). Greece is another user, and paid 1 Billion French Francs in 1998 for 11 systems: 9 for the Hellenic Air Force and 2 for the Hellenic Navy. In 2002 euros, that would have amounted up to 12 million euros per unit.
Crotale Mk.3 (system)In January 2008, France test-fired the new Crotale Mk.3 system at the CELM missile launch test center in Biscarrosse.  The Crotale Mk.3 system's VT1 missile successfully intercepted a Banshee target drone at 970 metre altitude and 8 km range in 11 seconds on 15 January 2008.  Later, on 31 January 2008, the system successfully intercepted another target drone at a 500-metre altitude and 15 km range in 35 seconds.
HQ-7
HQ-7 is a Chinese variant of Crotale.

Operators

Current operators 

  Royal Bahraini Army
  Egyptian Army (test in 1976)
  The Finnish Army operates 21 Crotale NGs on Sisu XA-181 vehicles, designated ITO90M.
  naval Crotale and land-based Crotale NG (12 systems)
  Crotale NG, used by Hellenic Air Force (9 systems) and Hellenic Navy (2 naval systems).
  Ya Zahra air defense system is an unlicensed Iranian copy of an unlicensed Chinese-copy of Crotale missiles.
  Crotale NG
  Pakistan Air Force
  K-SAM Pegasus (114 systems)
  Shahine, Crotale
 
  Ukraine operates two Crotale batteries

Future operators

Former operators 
  Iraqi Air Force
  First delivery in 1973.
  Portuguese Army (2 launching units with 1 radar delivered in 1974) Sold in 1976.
Peruvian Air Force (FAP)
  delivered from 1971 to 1973
  Chilean Air Force

 Royal Moroccan Army

See also 
 Roland missile (Franco-German surface-to-air missile)
 LFK NG (the future surface-to-air missile of the German Army)

References 

Naval surface-to-air missiles of France
Surface-to-air missiles of France
Cold War weapons of South Africa
Military equipment introduced in the 1970s